is a Japanese word that in the context of contemporary Japanese internet meme culture and its related slang is commonly used to refer to humorous homophonic reinterpretation, deliberately interpreting words as other similar-sounding words for comedy (similar to a mondegreen, but done deliberately).

The word is more commonly used for its original, literal meaning.

The slang usage is derived from the long-running "Soramimi Hour" segment on Japanese comedian Tamori's TV program Tamori Club. Tamori is one of the "big three" television comedians in Japan, and is very influential. The segment, in which he and his co-host watch mini-skits based on submissions from fans, began in 1992.

In modern Japanese internet culture, soramimi also includes videos with subtitles of humorously misinterpreted subtitles, or text transcripts that do the same. Unlike homophonic translation, soramimi can be contained within a single language. An example of "soramimi" humor confined to Japanese can be seen in the song Kaidoku Funō by the rock band Jinn, in which the lyrics "tōkankaku, hito no naka de" ("feeling of distance, amongst people"), which are considered hard to make out by Japanese listeners, are intentionally misinterpreted as "gōkan da, futon no naka de" ("it's rape, in a futon") for comedic reasons.

Soramimi applies to dialogue as well as song lyrics. For example, in the 2004 film Downfall, when Adolf Hitler says "und betrogen worden", it is misrepresented as "oppai purun purun" ("titty boing boing").

Soramimi humor was a staple in Japanese message board Flash animation culture from the late 90's to the mid-00s. It later became very popular on Niconico, a Japanese video-sharing website in which comments are overlaid directly onto the video, synced to specific playback times, allowing for soramimi subtitles to be easily added to any video.

See also
 Tamori
 Tamori Club
 Mondegreen – mishearing or misinterpretation of a phrase in a way that gives it a different meaning
 Homophonic translation – where a text in one language is translated into a near-homophonic text in another language, with no attempt to preserve the original meaning.

References

External links
 A list of past soramimi featured on "Soramimi Hour" (in Japanese)

zh-yue:唆啦咪咪
Japanese words and phrases
Phonology
Lyrics
Homophonic translation